Man On Wire is the third studio album by New Zealand rapper PNC. It was released on April 18, 2011.

Track listing

References

External links
 Pncmusic.co.nz

2011 albums
PNC (rapper) albums